Pilichowo may refer to the following places:
Pilichowo, Kuyavian-Pomeranian Voivodeship (north-central Poland)
Pilichowo, Masovian Voivodeship (east-central Poland)
Pilichowo, Pomeranian Voivodeship (north Poland)